Fermy 3 plemzavoda Parizhskaya Kommuna is a rural locality (a settlement) in Torgunskoye Rural Settlement, Staropoltavsky District, Volgograd Oblast, Russia. The population was 54 as of 2010. There are 13 streets.

Geography 
The settlement is located on the right bank of the Solyanka River, 71 km southeast of Staraya Poltavka (the district's administrative centre) by road. Torgun is the nearest rural locality.

References 

Rural localities in Staropoltavsky District